Warwickshire Cricket Board played in List A cricket matches between 1999 and 2002. This is a list of the players who appeared in those matches.

Sandy Allen (2002): APW Allen
Darren Altree (1999): DA Altree
David Bar (2001–2002): DJ Barr
Ian Bell (1999): IR Bell
Kevin Bray (1999–2001): KG Bray
Andrew Brookes (1999): AP Brookes
Ian Clifford (2001–2002): JI Clifford
Daniel Dalton (1999–2002): DAT Dalton
Richard Dandy (2001): R Dandy
Michael Dean (2002): MM Dean
Jan Dreyer (2000): JN Dreyer
Aamir Farooque (1999): A Farooque
Michael Foster (2000): MJ Foster
Simon Gear (2000): S Gear
Paul Griffiths (2002): PJ Griffiths
Christopher Howell (1999–2002): CR Howell
Neil Humphrey (2001–2002): NV Humphrey
Huw Jones (2001–2002): HR Jones
Bhavin Joshi (2001): B Joshi
Wasim Khan (2002): WG Khan
Shitanshu Kotak (2002): SH Kotak
Lee Marland (2002): LJ Marland
Steve McDonald (1999–2001): S McDonald
Tom Mees (2001): T Mees
Luke Parker (2001–2002): LC Parker
Spencer Platt (1999–2001): S Platt
Navdeep Poonia (2002): NS Poonia
Guriq Randhawa (2001): GS Randhawa
Naheem Sajjad (1999–2002): N Sajjad
Gavin Shephard (2001): GF Shephard
Jonathan Ship (2001): JA Ship
Adam Smyth (2000): AC Smyth
Jamie Spires (2001): JAS Spires
Jim Troughton (1999–2001): JO Troughton
Graham Wagg (2000–2002): GG Wagg
Waqar Mohammad (2001): Waqar Mohammad. Mohammad represented the Warwickshire Cricket Board in a single List A match against Lancashire in the 2001 Cheltenham & Gloucester Trophy.  In his only List A match, he scored 2 runs.
Nick Warren (2001): NA Warren
Ian Westwood (2001–2002): IJ Westwood
Elliot Wilson (2002): EJ Wilson

References

Warwickshire Cricket Board